Anastasija Čemirtāne (born 17 October 1999) is a Latvian footballer who plays as a midfielder for Sieviešu Futbola Līga club Rīgas FS and the Latvia women's national team.

References

1999 births
Living people
Latvian women's footballers
Women's association football midfielders
Rīgas FS players
Latvia women's youth international footballers
Latvia women's international footballers